Fabien Tchenkoua (born 1 October 1992) is a Cameroonian footballer who most recently played for Carl Zeiss Jena. He was born in Nkongsamba in Cameroon.

Professional career
In July 2013, he moved from CS Sedan to Paris FC. The following year, in August, he transferred to Grenoble Foot 38 and then to Nîmes Olympique the year after. In January 2016 he moved to his current club Sint-Truidense VV.

He was part of the Grenoble team that beat Olympique Marseille in the first round of the Coupe de France on penalties on 4 January 2015. Despite not scoring any goals, he was seen as one of the heroes by destroying the opponent's defence.

References

External links
 

1992 births
Living people
People from Nkongsamba
Cameroonian footballers
French footballers
French sportspeople of Cameroonian descent
Association football wingers
Sint-Truidense V.V. players
CS Sedan Ardennes players
Nîmes Olympique players
Grenoble Foot 38 players
Paris FC players
FC Carl Zeiss Jena players
3. Liga players